A bachelorette is an unmarried woman. Bachelorette may also refer to:

Film and television
 The Bachelorette, a reality television dating show part of The Bachelor franchise with numerous versions:
 The Bachelorette (American TV series), the original American version that debuted in 2003
 The Bachelorette (Australian TV series), the Australian version that debuted in 2015
 The Bachelorette Canada, the Canadian version that debuted in 2016
 The Bachelorette India, the 2013 Indian version
 Bachelorette (film), a 2012 American film

Music
 "Bachelorette" (song), a 1997 single by Icelandic singer Björk
 "Bachelorette", a 1998 B-side song by American recording artist Tori Amos
 Bachelorette (singer), a musical project by New Zealand singer Annabel Alpers

Other uses
 Studio apartment, called a "bachelorette" in Canada

See also
 Bachelorette party
 Single Ladies (disambiguation)
 A Single Woman (disambiguation)
 Bachelor (disambiguation)